Jonathan Rogers may refer to:
Jonathan Clark Rogers (1885–1967), American college president
Jonathan Rogers (GC) (1920–1964), Welsh-born Australian recipient of the George Cross
Jonathan L. Rogers, American accounting scholar

See also
Jon Rogers (disambiguation)